The Pacific Airshow is an annual airshow held in Huntington Beach, California. The first Pacific Airshow (first called the Breitling Huntington Beach Airshow, then later The Great Pacific Airshow) took place in 2016, attracting hundreds of thousands to Huntington Beach for a display of aviation skill and military might soaring over the beach in Southern California. Spanning over three days, the Airshow features the best in military and civilian flight demonstrations from international teams, including past performances by the U.S. Navy Blue Angels, U.S. Air Force Thunderbirds, Royal Air Force Red Arrows and Canadian Forces Snowbirds. In only five years, Pacific Airshow has twice been named Civilian Airshow of the Year by the U.S. Air Force Thunderbirds and in 2019 named among the Top 5 Air Shows by USA Today’s 10Best. The event has become the cornerstone of the fall calendar for residents and visitors from as far away as Europe and Asia while delivering a more than $105 million economic impact to the City of Huntington Beach alone and even broader economic benefits to the County of Orange and Southern California.

The air show in 2020 was canceled due to public health concerns associated with the COVID-19 outbreak. The third and final day of the event was cancelled in response to the 2021 Orange County oil spill

References

Air shows in the United States
Annual events in California
Huntington Beach, California
2016 establishments in California